Pedro Santisteve Roche (born 28 May 1958) is a Spanish criminal lawyer, social activist and university professor. He was the mayor of Zaragoza from 13 June 2015 until 15 June 2019.

Santisteve graduated in law and has been a criminal lawyer since 1984. He is a vocal critic of the current penitentiary system and an advocate for the rights of the prisoners. He is the founder of the Asociación de Seguimiento y Apoyo a Presas y Presos en Aragón (Association for Monitoring and Supporting Prisoners in Aragon, ASAPA), which in 2000 received a medal from the Aragon Provincial Council. Since the 1990s, he has been a professor in the Faculty of Law of the University of Zaragoza.

Santisteve's political career began with the 15-M movement. In 2015 he won the party primary of Ganemos Zaragoza, which involved more than 3,700 people. As a result, Santisteve was the head of list of the political alliance Zaragoza in Común (ZeC), formed by Podemos, Izquierda Unida, Equo, Puyalón de Cuchas, Piratas de Aragón and Somos y Demos+. Santisteve's party and platform in the municipal election emphasized institutional transparency, participatory decision-making, accountability and a broader social policy. On 24 May 2015, the party won  votes (24.57%) and 9 councillors, remaining as the second political force behind PP, with 10 councilors, and above PSOE, with 6 councilors, Citizens, with 4 and CHA with 2.

On 13 June 2015, councilors from the Zaragoza en Común (ZeC), PSOE and Chunta Aragonesista (CHA) parties elected Santisteve as mayor.

References

1958 births
Living people
Mayors of Zaragoza
People from Zaragoza